Berezonavolok is a rural locality (a village) in Verkhneuftyugskoye Rural Settlement, Krasnoborsky District, Arkhangelsk Oblast, Russia. The population was 134 as of 2010. There are 14 streets.

Geography 
Berezonavolok is located 36 km east of Krasnoborsk (the district's administrative centre) by road. Zavasevskaya is the nearest rural locality.

References 

Rural localities in Krasnoborsky District